Kharistvala is a so called daba (urban-type settlement) in Georgia’s northern Ambrolauri Municipality (Racha-Lechkhumi and Kvemo Svaneti region), at an elevation of  above sea level on the western shore of Shaori Reservoir. Remarkably, the settlement has no permanent population (2021), while still registered as a daba. Kharistvala is administratively part of the Nikortsminda community (თემი, temi) which also consists of villages Kachaeti and Nikortsminda, known for the Nikortsminda Cathedral. It acquired the daba status in 1956.

Geology  

The settlement is located in a karst plateau that is part of the Racha Range. The reservoir was created by the placement of an earthen dam in the northwestern corner of the local depression in the plateau and is mainly fed by groundwater. The depression originally contained a few smaller lakes: Kharistvala and Dzrokhistvala. The Shaori reservoir has an area of over 9 km² with a maximum depth of 14 meters and is the upper part of the Shaori-Tkibuli hydroelectric power chain.

South from the reservoir is the Nakerala Range, a limestone range that is part of the Racha Range with sharp cliffs.

History 
The settlement hosted workers and geologists in the 1950s that were involved in the construction of the Shaori-Tkibuli hydroelectric power chain. The Tkibuli reservoir is located 13 kilometers to the southwest and  lower in the Imereti region. The hydroelectric power station opened in 1955. During this period, the Soviet government recognized the health nature of the Shaori area and designated it as a resort destination and giving Kharistvala the status of daba. With the project finished, and in lack of deploying resort activities, the settlement has depopulated. Big development plans have frequently been announced after the 2003 Rose Revolution, but as of 2022 nothing came of that except for the construction of one hotel.

Demographics 
Kharistvala has no permanent population according to the 2021 statistics.

References

Populated places in Ambrolauri Municipality